Panos Pictures is a photo agency based in London and founded in 1986. It specialises in stories about global social issues for international media and NGOs using photography and video. It also produces exhibitions and long-term documentary projects. As of September 2015, Adrian Evans is its director and has a controlling share in the company.

Details
Panos Pictures began in 1986 as a small independent for-profit photo agency specialising in environmental issues. It was founded and partly owned by environmental charity Panos London (the Panos Institute's London office) out of its photo archive. Adrian Evans joined as director in 1990 and spent five years overseeing its expansion.

Panos London closed in 2013. The Panos Institute, a sister organisation of Panos Pictures, has been renamed Panos Network, a network of five member institutes.

Panos Pictures has at any time a group of twenty of its photographers, called Panos Profile, whom it represents more comprehensively than its wider group of photographers, which it calls Panos Network (this Panos Network should not be confused with the sister organisation described above).

Photographers who have been affiliated with Panos

Publications
Amnesty International: Celebrating Human Dignity and Freedom: Photos by Panos Pictures. New York: Universe, 2010. . Amnesty International wall calendar.
Amnesty International: 2013: Photos by Panos Pictures. New York: Universe, 2012. . Amnesty International wall calendar.
Amnesty International: 2015: Photos by Panos Pictures. New York: Universe, 2014. . Amnesty International wall calendar.
Agenda-Diary 2015: Photographs by Panos Pictures. . Amnesty International weekly planner.

Exhibitions
Coffee and Cafes, Society Café, Bath, 27 March 2012 – ?. Photographs by Panos Pictures photographers Adam Hinton, Alfredo D’Amato, Mark Henley, Ivor Prickett, Fredrik Naumann, George Georgiou, Chris Stowers, Stefan Boness, Alfredo Caliz, Stuart Freedman, Tim Dirven and Liba Taylor.
Call the World Brother, Aberystwyth Arts Centre, 23 May – 14 July 2013. Photographs by Panos Pictures photographers GMB Akash, Chloe Dewe Mathews, Robin Hammond, Chris Keulen, Andrew McConnell, Espen Rasmussen, Martin Roemers and Stephan Vanfleteren. Coincided with The Eye International Photography Festival and represented 25 years of Panos Pictures.
#FutureofCities, Somerset House, London, 24 April – 10 May 2015.

See also
Agence Vu
Black Star (photo agency)
Gamma (agency)
Magnum Photos
Sygma (agency)
VII Photo Agency

References

External links

Conversations in Photography: 25 years of Panos Pictures (27 minute video)

Photo agencies
Organizations established in 1986
1986 establishments in England
Photojournalism organizations
United Kingdom journalism organisations
British photography organisations